Copper Sunrise is a children's novel by Canadian author Bryan Buchan. It was first published in 1972.

Copper Sunrise is a historical fiction that explores issues that surrounded interactions between Europeans and Native North Americans. This issue is presented to the reader through Jamie, a young boy from Scotland, who, during the early days of colonization in Canada, encounters the last of the Beothuk native people, and despite his father's warnings, befriends a native boy named Tethani. However, the settlers detest the natives and call them savages. They say that the natives are cannibals that eat each other and have permanently red skin but Jamie learns better. The arrival of George Wilfred Craven changes everything. He drives even more hate into the settlers and convinces them to take part in the mass murder of the natives. Jamie and Tethani  work hard to trip as many traps as they can to help protect the natives but then Tethani and his family are shot by... At the end of the story, Jamie sees a copper sunrise and recognises this as a symbol that Tethani and his family have made it to the spirit world, hence the name Copper Sunrise {by Bryan Buchan}.

References

1972 Canadian novels
Canadian children's novels
Children's historical novels
First Nations novels
Novels set in Newfoundland and Labrador
1972 children's books